Malvinas Argentinas Partido is a partido in Buenos Aires Province, Argentina, in the Gran Buenos Aires urban area.

Its name reflects Argentina's disputed claims of sovereignty over the Falkland Islands (Islas Malvinas in Spanish). It was created on October 20, 1994 by Provincial Law #11551, taking some of the territory of former General Sarmiento Partido.

Los Polvorines is its capital, founded on the Ferrocarril General Manuel Belgrano railway, along with the neighboring town of Del Viso. The union of the lands around these two train stations originated the district.

By Decree #4520, the federal government on 17 December 1908, created the train stop Los Polvorines, which name came from the Sargento Cabral munitions depot (polvorín in Spanish), established by the Argentine Army nearby.

Settlements
El Triángulo
Los Polvorines
Grand Bourg
Ingeniero Adolfo Sourdeaux
Ingeniero Pablo Nogués
Tierras Altas
Tortuguitas
Villa de Mayo

References

External links
 Municipalidad de Malvinas Argentinas
 InfoBAN noticias de Malvinas Argentinas

 
1994 establishments in Argentina
Partidos of Buenos Aires Province